Bradley Vering (born August 21, 1977) is a United States Olympic athlete who competes in Greco-Roman wrestling.

Early years
Vering was born in Schuyler, Nebraska. He attended Howells High School in Howells, Nebraska and was a letterman in football and wrestling. Coached by Nebraska Hall of Fame member Lee Schroeder in wrestling, he was a three-time Nebraska State Champion and finished with a career record of 148-2.

College
Vering attended the University of Nebraska-Lincoln. During his college wrestling career he was a three-time All-American and a national champion as a junior. Vering placed 4th as a sophomore, won the national championship at the 197 pound weight class his junior year, and took 7th his senior year.

Olympics and World Championships
Internationally, Vering was a world silver medalist in 2007, helping lead the United States to a Greco-Roman World Championship.

Vering went to the Olympics in 2004 on the USA Olympic Greco Team. He made the 2008 team as well, where he competed in Beijing.

 2007 World silver medalist, helped lead U.S. to team Greco-Roman title
 Two-time U.S. Olympic Team member (2004, 2008)
 Four-time U.S. World Team member (2002, 2003, 2005, 2007)
 Fifth at 2002 and 2003 World Championships
 Four-time U.S. Nationals champion (2003, 2004, 2005, 2007)

References

External links
 
 Official Brad Vering 2008 Olympics site

Olympic wrestlers of the United States
Wrestlers at the 2007 Pan American Games
Wrestlers at the 2004 Summer Olympics
Wrestlers at the 2008 Summer Olympics
1977 births
Living people
People from Schuyler, Nebraska
American male sport wrestlers
Pan American Games silver medalists for the United States
Pan American Games medalists in wrestling
World Wrestling Championships medalists
Medalists at the 2003 Pan American Games